Rachel Maclean may refer to:

 Rachel Maclean (artist) (born 1987), Scottish artist
 Rachel Maclean (politician) (born 1965), British politician

See also
 Murder of Rachel McLean, a 1991 UK murder case